The Spiral, also known as 66 Hudson Boulevard, is a 66-floor skyscraper in Hudson Yards, Manhattan, New York City. The tower is being designed by the Danish architectural firm Bjarke Ingels Group, which also designed the nearby West 57.

The Spiral will be located on 34th Street between Hudson Boulevard and Tenth Avenue. When completed, The Spiral will join other developments made possible by rezoning, including Hudson Yards, 3 Hudson Boulevard and Manhattan West. A distinguishing feature of the building is that each floor will have outdoor gardens that will spiral around the building.

History 
The tower was initially conceptualized in 2014 as the Hudson Spire, with a  roof height a  architectural height. It was marketed as the tallest building in the Western Hemisphere.

In late 2015, Tishman Speyer paid $25 million to two men who had refused to move from their apartment at 10th Avenue and 34th Street, the future site of the Spiral. In exchange, the men agreed to relocate. The developer had spent $438 million on the property and its surrounding area, but despite a court order in Tishman Speyer's favor, the pair had remained until the payout was awarded.

On August 27, 2017, pharmaceutical firm Pfizer announced plans to move the company's world headquarters into  in the new building, taking up floors 7 through 21. The company officially signed a 20-year lease in April 2018, in conjunction with Blackstone providing a $1.8 billion construction loan, one of the largest such loans in New York City history. The building topped-out in January 2021. As of June 2022, the facade was being completed.

Tenants
The building will include a restaurant run by Erik Ramirez and Juan Correa in its base. Ramirez and Correa are known for Llama San, in the West Village and Llama Inn, in Williamsburg.

Tenants will move in once the tower is complete, including:

Floor 2: NewYork-Presbyterian Hospital
Floor 3: Turner Construction
Floors 7-21: Pfizer
Floors 25-28: AllianceBernstein
Floors 40-52: Debevoise & Plimpton
Three unspecified floors: HSBC

Other tenants include Baker Tilly and SEB Group.

See also
List of tallest buildings in New York City

References

External links
Official website
Developer's page on the project

Hudson Yards, Manhattan
Buildings and structures under construction in the United States
Hell's Kitchen, Manhattan
Office buildings in Manhattan
Skyscraper office buildings in Manhattan
34th Street (Manhattan)